Cole House (born February 5, 1988) is an American cyclist. He originally raced in BMX and mountain biking during his youth before switching to road racing at the age of 18. He is a member of the Oneida tribe: his mother is Oneida and his father is of mixed Oneida, Ojibwe and Belgian descent. He is from Wisconsin.

Major results
2006
 1st Stage 5 Tour de l'Abitibi
2008
 5th Overall Tour of Belize
1st Stage 3 (TTT)
 7th Ronde van Vlaanderen U23
2009
 1st GP Waregem
2010
 1st Stage 3 Valley of the Sun Stage Race
 1st Stage 11 International Cycling Classic
 9th Kampioenschap van Vlaanderen
2011
 1st Stage 1 Sea Otter Classic

References

1988 births
Living people
American male cyclists
Oneida people
Cyclists from Wisconsin
American people of Ojibwe descent
American people of Belgian descent